Jan de Bruine (15 July 1903 – 4 April 1983) was a Dutch equestrian and Olympic medalist. He was born in Winschoten. He won a silver medal in show jumping at the 1936 Summer Olympics in Berlin.

References

1903 births
1983 deaths
Dutch male equestrians
Olympic equestrians of the Netherlands
Olympic silver medalists for the Netherlands
Equestrians at the 1936 Summer Olympics
Equestrians at the 1948 Summer Olympics
Olympic medalists in equestrian
People from Winschoten
Medalists at the 1936 Summer Olympics
Sportspeople from Groningen (province)
20th-century Dutch people